Atet Wijono (born 11 March 1951) is a former tennis player from Indonesia.

Career
Wijono appeared in two Grand Slam tournaments during his career, the 1970 US Open, where he was beaten in the first round by Pancho Segura and the 1971 French Open, where he also lost in the opening round, to François Jauffret.

From 1969 to 1982, Wijono was a regular fixture in the Indonesia Davis Cup team. He twice beat Indian Anand Amritraj and also had a win over Australian John Cooper. His overall Davis Cup record is 13/25, with eight singles wins and five doubles victories.
	
He was a singles gold medalist at the 1978 Asian Games in Bangkok, defeating Japan's Shigeyuki Nishio in the gold medal playoff. The Indonesian is also a Southeast Asian Games gold medalist.

References

1951 births
Living people
Indonesian male tennis players
Asian Games medalists in tennis
People from Cirebon
Tennis players at the 1978 Asian Games
Asian Games gold medalists for Indonesia
Medalists at the 1978 Asian Games
Southeast Asian Games gold medalists for Indonesia
Southeast Asian Games silver medalists for Indonesia
Southeast Asian Games bronze medalists for Indonesia
Southeast Asian Games medalists in tennis
Competitors at the 1977 Southeast Asian Games